The Argentine Center of International Studies (Centro Argentino de Estudios Internacionales, CAEI) is a think tank for international relations in Buenos Aires, Argentina that claims to be nonpartisan and independent.

CAEI publishes a range of studies in the field of international relations, which are all published electronically and are available free of charge. Apart from an international e-book series, the journal Argentina Global, Observatorio de Bolivia, Observatorio Malvinense and other series, all also contained in the electronic reference system IDEAS/REPEC of the University of Connecticut, the CAEI also publishes a series of working papers in English, Spanish and other major languages, with contributions from major universities and research centers on the world.

In the University of Pennsylvania's reporting of Global Think Tanks in the framework of its Think Tanks and Civil Societies Program, 2010, entitled "2010 Global Go To Report – Think Tank Index – UNEDITION", January 2011, the CAEI is ranked among the top new think tanks around the globe.

References

External links
 

Think tanks based in Argentina
International relations